The following is a list of episodes of the Canadian animated series Class of the Titans created by Studio B Productions and Nelvana. The first three episodes premiered on December 31, 2005 at 5PM ET/PT on Teletoon as a special 90-minute presentation.

Episodes

Season 1 (2005–06)
Episodes 1, 2, and 3 aired as a 90-minute 'special presentation'. Episodes 8 and 18 were meant to air on Halloween and Valentine's Day respectively when the series was still originally supposed to air in September 2005 in Canada. These episodes first aired in Australia and Singapore respectively.

Season 2 (2007–08)
The second season first aired on Teletoon on August 17, 2007.

DVD releases
Three DVDs have been released so far, all containing episodes from season one.

References

External links
Episodes Guides:
 Season 2 Original Air Dates
 IMDB: Episode list
 Epguides: Episodes - Air Dates & Titles
DVD Releases:
 TV Shows on DVD: DVD releases

Class of the Titans